Gil Hardcastle (26 February 1910 – 14 February 2000) was an Australian cricketer. He played in one first-class match for Queensland in 1935/36.

References

1910 births
2000 deaths
Australian cricketers
Queensland cricketers
Cricketers from Brisbane